Vrachasi is a village and a former municipality in the Lasithi regional unit, Crete, Greece. Since the 2011 local government reform it is part of the municipality of Agios Nikolaos, of which it is a municipal unit.

Main sights
Vrachasi is a village of a few hundred people and typical of many around, but it has some interesting features and the traditional Cretan architecture is well preserved here. The main square of Vrachasi sits close to the road and has a wide view into the valley below, through which passes the main highway between Agios Nikolaos and Heraklion.

Vrachasi's fiercely independent streak mirrors that of nearby Sisi and Milatos and can be seen by the many hand painted declarations of 'Dimos Vrachasiou' around the area.

See also
Sisi

References

Populated places in Lasithi